Albarka Radio is a radio station broadcasting on 97.5 MHz FM located in Bauchi, Bauchi State, Nigeria.

The station started full operation on 1 November 2017. In 2019, one of the station's on-air personalities, Ibrahim Bababa, was attacked by several people who stormed the station during his shift.

References 

Radio stations in Nigeria
Radio stations established in 2017
2017 establishments in Nigeria